WVIE may refer to:

 WVIE (FM), a radio station (107.3 FM) licensed to serve Charlotte Amalie, U.S. Virgin Islands
 WQLL, a radio station (1370 AM) licensed to serve Pikesville, Maryland, United States, which used the call sign WVIE from 2006 until 2012
 WNPX-LD, a low-power television station (channel 24) licensed to serve Nashville, Tennessee, United States, which used the call sign WVIE-LP from 1998 until 2003